Hepialiscus is a genus of moths of the family Hepialidae. There are four described species found in Taiwan and Nepal. The larvae feed on grasses.

Species
Hepialiscus monticola - Taiwan
Hepialiscus nepalensis - Nepal
Hepialiscus robinsoni - Taiwan
Hepialiscus taiwanus - Taiwan

External links
Hepialidae genera

Hepialidae
Exoporia genera
Taxa named by George Hampson